Demon Hole is a 2017 American black comedy slasher film written, edited, and directed by Josh Crook. It stars Samantha Scaffidi as Luce, a rebellious homeless girl who serves community service in a desolate forest with five other teens—at a site where a fracking crew unleashed the demonic entity Molok (Samhain).

The film premiered at the Cannes Film Festival on May 22, 2017.

Premise

Cast
 Samantha Scaffidi as Luce
 Austin Ramsey as Kyle
 Paris Campbell as Reggie
 Summer Bills as Tiffany
 Adrian Denzel

Development
In 2016, filming began, when Samantha Scaffidi, Austin Ramsey, Paris Campbell, Summer Bills and Adrian Denzel were cast in the comedy horror film Demon Hole.

Release
The film premiered at the 2017 Cannes Film Festival on May 22, 2017 and was picked up by SC Films and SP Releasing.

Reception
Dutch film magazine Schokkend Nieuws highlighted the film's premise in their review as being "promising," but the film ends up being a "missed opportunity." The magazine criticizes it for failing to delve into the political undertones it initially suggests to address. As a result, the magazine writes, "it did not become a critical and politically relevant film." It condemns the film for abandoning the initial political turmoil themes to succumb to a predictable plot.

References

External links 
 
 

2010s horror thriller films
2010s supernatural horror films
2017 films
2017 horror films
American comedy horror films
American ghost films
American horror thriller films
American mystery films
American sequel films
American supernatural horror films
Demons in film
Films about exorcism
Films about spirit possession
American horror drama films
2010s English-language films
2010s American films